Calvin L. Noble (born October 13, 1813 in Trumbull County, Ohio, United States), is known primarily for spelling the name of Cleveland, Ohio incorrectly.

Noble learned printing and founded a Democratic newspaper in Cleveland, the Cleveland Advertiser, in 1830, when he was but 17.  As the type was too wide for his display head-line he left out one letter and changed the spelling from "Cleaveland" to "Cleveland," and the public adopted the change.

In September, 1833, he located to Fort Defiance, when all the Northwest Territory was "a howling wilderness inhabited by Indians".  Mr. Noble was employed as a fur buyer for the American Fur Company, fur being the principal source of revenue in northwestern Ohio at the time.

He later became an agent for the American Land Company, and then laid out the city of Bryan, Ohio, which became the county seat of Williams County, Ohio. He served in the Ohio House of Representatives, then as County Recorder and County Commissioner of Williams County.

In 1856, Noble moved to Paulding, and became a probate judge. For 12 years, he also collected the leases of the Miami and Erie Canal, the canal having ceased operations.

Judge Noble died in Paulding on April 10, 1889.

Source: Howe's Historical Collections of Ohio, by Henry Howe, 1903.

1813 births
1889 deaths
County commissioners in Ohio
Politicians from Cleveland
History of Cleveland
Ohio state court judges
19th-century American newspaper publishers (people)
People from Trumbull County, Ohio
Democratic Party members of the Ohio House of Representatives
19th-century American journalists
American male journalists
19th-century American male writers
Journalists from Ohio
People from Paulding, Ohio
19th-century American politicians
19th-century American judges